Peter Wonka is an Austrian computer scientist and Professor and Associate Director at the Visual Computing Center at King Abdullah University of Science and Technology, Saudi Arabia. He was previously employed at the Arizona State University as Associate Professor and is a recipient of the National Science Foundation Career Award.

His main contributions lie in the areas of computer graphics, scientific visualization and image processing.

Biography 
Peter Wonka received a master's degree in computer science from Vienna University of Technology in 1997. He continued his graduate studies there, receiving his PhD degree for the thesis "Occlusion Culling for Real-Time Rendering of Urban Environments" in 2001 as well as a master's degree in urban planning in 2002.

After researching at UJF Grenoble and Georgia Institute of Technology, Peter Wonka joined the faculty of Arizona State University in 2004 as an Assistant Professor and then as Associate Professor. In 2011, he relocated to King Abdullah University of Science and Technology, where he is currently employed as Professor.

References

External links
 Peter Wonka's webpage

Living people
20th-century births
American computer scientists
21st-century American engineers
Arizona State University faculty
Year of birth missing (living people)